Exolaunch GmbH is a German launch services, mission management, and deployment systems provider based in Berlin, Germany.  The company's main focus is the deployment of small satellites, ranging from CubeSats to microsatellites.

History 
Exolaunch was a spin-off from the Technical University of Berlin. Since its founding, Exolaunch has supported the deployment of over 100 satellites. Exolaunch has provided mission management and launch services for payloads on Soyuz and Electron rockets and has announced agreements with SpaceX and New Space India Limited. The company specialises in rideshare launches, in which small satellites are deployed as secondary payloads in a launch, alongside the usually larger primary payloads.

Around one third of Spire Global's constellation of Lemur satellites have been supported by Exolaunch since 2016. Momentus Space and Exolaunch announced a partnership in July 2017 relating to the provision of water plasma propulsion technologies for use in payload delivery. In August 2018, Iceye announced an agreement with Exolaunch to launch two or more satellites with synthetic-aperture radar. Exolaunch's largest rideshare mission to date took place in July 2019 on the Soyuz-2 launch vehicle. The mission consisted of the deployment of 28 smallsats which included 25 CubeSats ranging from 0.25U to 16U and two commercial microsatellites. This launch also saw the qualification of Exolaunch's microsatellite separation system, CarboNIX.

Manufacture 
Exolaunch designs and manufactures in-house small satellite deployment systems, EXOpod for CubeSats and CarboNIX for microsatellites. It also manufactures EXObox, a deployment sequencer to manage the deployment of up to 50 satellites.

EXOpod 
The EXOpod is a CubeSat deployer which comes in two size variants, 12U and 16U, and can be configured with up to four independent slots. CubeSats in EXOpod are provided with more space for payloads and can be heavier than what is specified in the CubeSat Design Specification limits. Windows on two sides of the deployer provide access to the CubeSat, enabling inspection, testing and RBF pin removal after integration. EXOpods have been used to launch 80 CubeSats ranging from 0.25U to 16U in size since 2017. The system is made in Germany and is not subject to export restrictions of any kind.

CarboNIX 
CarboNIX is a separation system for smallsats with a wet mass (including fuel) of between 10 and 200 kg. The lack of traditional pyrotechnic method, reduces the risk of damaging satellites with optical payloads and electronic components. This is combined with a spring pusher system that separates the satellite before the shocks are generated. It is also produced in Germany and ITAR – free meaning that the system is not subject to export restrictions of any kind.

EXObox 
EXObox is a deployment sequencer for managing satellite cluster deployment, with a capacity of up to 50 smallsats. It aims to simplify the adaptation and separation of small satellites into their target orbits.

References

See also 
 Exolaunch Official Site

Commercial launch service providers
Companies based in Berlin
Technical University of Berlin